Veltman is a Dutch surname translating as "field man". Notable people with the surname include:

Alexander Veltman (1800–1870), Russian writer
Calvin Veltman (born 1941), American sociolinguist
Daryl Veltman (born 1985), Canadian lacrosse player
Esther Veltman (born 1966), Dutch cricketer
Jim Veltman (born 1966), Canadian lacrosse player
Joël Veltman (born 1992), Dutch footballer
Kim H. Veltman (born 1948), Dutch/Canadian historian of science 
Marieke Veltman (born 1971), American long jumper and heptathlete
Martinus J. G. Veltman (1931–2021), Dutch theoretical physicist and Nobel Prize laureate
Known for a.o. the Van Dam-Veltman-Zakharov discontinuity
Nathaniel Veltman (born 2001), Canadian accused of London, Ontario truck attack
Pat Veltman (1906–1980), American baseball player
Steve Veltman (born 1969), American cyclist
Thierry Veltman (born 1939), Dutch  painter, sculptor, and ceramist
Vera Veltman pseudonym of Vera Panova (1905–1973), Soviet novelist, playwright, and journalist

See also
9492 Veltman, main-belt asteroid named after Martinus J. G. Veltman
Veldman, Dutch surname of the same origin

References

Dutch-language surnames